Han Hyo-joo (Korean: 한효주; born February 22, 1987) is a South Korean film and television actress, model and singer. She is best known for her leading roles in television series such as Heaven & Earth (2007), Iljimae (2008), Brilliant Legacy (2009), Dong Yi (2010) for which she won the coveted Best Actress award at the 47th Baeksang Arts Awards, W (2016) and Happiness (2021), as well as the films Masquerade (2012), which is one of the highest grossing Korean films of all-time, Cold Eyes (2013), for which she won Best Actress at the 34th Blue Dragon Film Awards, Love 911 (2012), The Beauty Inside (2015), and The Pirates: The Last Royal Treasure (2022).

Early life
Han Hyo-joo was born in Cheongju, North Chungcheong Province. Her mother was an elementary school teacher before becoming an inspector for public schools, and her father was an air force officer. As a child, she was good in sports, particularly track and field. In her sophomore year of high school, she moved to Seoul and attended Bulgok High School, despite the objections of her strict and conservative father. She then entered Dongguk University, where she joined the theater and film department.

Career

2003–2006: Beginnings
Han was first discovered in a teenage beauty pageant organized by food corporation Binggrae in 2003. She began her acting career in the sitcom Nonstop 5 and the gangster comedy film My Boss, My Teacher. Han later raised her profile by starring in Spring Waltz, the fourth and final installment of TV director Yoon Seok-ho's "season drama" series.

In 2006, director Lee Yoon-ki cast Han in the starring role in his low-budget independent film Ad-lib Night, which follows a young woman who rediscovers herself through an eerie overnight encounter with strangers. She won the Best New Actress awards at the Korean Association of Film Critics Awards and Singapore International Film Festival for her performance.

2007–2010: Breakthrough roles and overseas popularity
Han then starred in two highly successful TV projects and rose to fame - KBS daily drama Heaven & Earth with Park Hae-jin in 2007, and SBS masked-adventurer series Iljimae with Lee Joon-gi in 2008. Both dramas drew solid viewership ratings nationwide throughout its run with high viewer ratings and launched Han into a household name. Afterwards, she was cast in another indie film, Ride Away, which debuted at the 2008 Jeonju International Film Festival.

Han then filmed the Korean-Japanese telecinema co-production Heaven's Postman, which also featured pop star Jaejoong from TVXQ (now JYJ). After several postponements, it was released in theaters in late 2009, and broadcast on TV in 2010.

Han's breakthrough came in Brilliant Legacy costarring Lee Seung-gi, which became a massive hit in 2009, reaching a peak viewership rating of 47.1%. It catapulted Han to stardom, and after the drama's conclusion, she experienced a sharp rise in endorsement deals and media requests for interviews, as well as increased pan-Asian popularity. Later that year Han wrapped up her starring role in the musical drama Soul Special, which aired on KBS Joy.

In 2010, Han took on the titular character in MBC's 49th anniversary project Dong Yi, The series became a hit during its run both domestically and across Asia. Han won several acting awards for her portrayal of Choi Suk-bin, including the Daesang (Grand Prize) award at MBC Drama Awards and the coveted Best Actress award at Baeksang Arts Awards.

2011–2015: Film roles
In 2011, Han played a blind telemarketer opposite So Ji-sub's ex-boxer in the melodrama film Always. Helmed by director Song Il-gon, it premiered as the opening film of the 2011 Busan International Film Festival. Han later contributed voice narration to the "barrier-free" version of Japanese film My Back Page, which features descriptive audio and subtitles for people with hearing or visual impairments.

Han then played the queen to Lee Byung-hun's Gwanghae in the 2012 blockbuster period film Masquerade, which became one of the highest-grossing Korean films of all time. She followed that with Love 911, an unlikely romance between a doctor and a firefighter (Go Soo).

In 2013, Han starred opposite Sol Kyung-gu and Jung Woo-sung in action thriller Cold Eyes, a remake of the 2007 Hong Kong film Eye in the Sky. The film dominated the box office after its release and became one of the biggest domestic hits of 2013. Han received acting recognition for her performance, winning Best Actress from the Blue Dragon Film Awards and Buil Film Awards.

In 2014, Han and Love 911 costar Go Soo reunited in Myohyangsangwan ("View of Mount Myohyang"), which depicts the rendezvous of a South Korean painter and a North Korean waitress in a North Korean restaurant. The short film is a collaboration by contemporary artists Moon Kyung-won and Jeon Joon-ho, and combined a theatrical plot, experimental imagery, dance and performance art.

She then ventured into the overseas market by starring in her first Japanese film, Isshin Inudo's Miracle: Debikuro-kun no Koi to Maho ("Miracle Devil Claus' Love and Magic"). Set during the Christmas season, the film is a love story about a kind bookstore employee (played by Masaki Aiba from J-pop boyband Arashi) who meets three women.

In 2015, Han starred in the musical biopic C'est Si Bon, which depicted the ups and downs of the folk music group Twin Folio, which was active from the 1960s to 80s. Famous for its live performances, C'est Si Bon was the name of a popular music lounge located in Mugyo-dong in the 1970s, where Twin Folio got its start; Han played the group's muse. This was followed by romantic comedy film The Beauty Inside, where Han's character falls in love with a man who changes to different people every day.

Later that year, Han got together with Yoo Yeon-seok and Chun Woo-hee, both of her co-stars in The Beauty Inside, again for  Love, Lies, a movie which depicts the last story of gisaeng during the Japanese occupation in the 1940s.

2016–present: Television comeback and American advancement
In 2016, Han returned to the small screen with MBC's fantasy suspense series W alongside Lee Jong-suk. Helmed by director Jung Dae-yoon who directed She Was Pretty and writer Song Jae-jung whose previous works include Nine: Nine Time Travels and Queen In-hyun's Man, expectations were high as this marked Han's return to the small screen after 6 years. She won the Top Excellence award at the 5th APAN Star Awards and MBC Drama Awards for her performance in W.

In 2018, Han starred in the thriller Golden Slumber alongside Kang Dong-won. The same year, she reunited with Kang as the female lead in sci-fi action thriller Illang: The Wolf Brigade, based on the Japanese animated flick of the same name.

In 2019, Han was confirmed as part of the main cast of American television series Treadstone, an offshoot from Universal's Bourne franchise.

In 2020, Han was cast in a Japanese action film Taiyō wa Ugokanai ("The Sun Stands Still"), directed by Eiichiro Hasumi. Based on the novel of the same name, Han plays an elusive and mysterious spy who travels across the world on adventures whilst hiding her true intentions.

In 2021, Han acted as a member of a counter-terrorist squad in the apocalyptic thriller drama Happiness, starring opposite Park Hyung-sik. Directed by Ahn Gil-Ho, the drama depicted class discrimination, conflicting human desires and the struggle for survival amongst a group of house-owners in an apartment in Korea due to a mysterious virus outbreak that threatens the livelihood of the inhabitants in a city.

In 2022, Han stars alongside Kang Ha-neul and Lee Kwang-soo in The Pirates: The Last Royal Treasure, the sequel to the 2014 blockbuster The Pirates. She plays the role of Hae-rang, the captain of the pirate ship. The film marks her return to Korean cinema after 4 years since Illang: The Wolf Brigade. In October, Han made a special appearance in the film 20th Century Girl, playing the adult version of Kim Yoo-jung's character.

Personal life
Han is trilingual, able to speak Korean, English and Japanese.

Philanthropy
In May 2022, Han donated 50 million won to Asan Medical Center, and also donated 50 million won in 2021. It will be used for the cost of treatment such as surgery so that young patients do not miss treatment due to economic burdens.

Controversy

Legal action allegations
In November 2013, the Seoul Central District Prosecutors Office indicted Han's ex-manager from her former agency Fantom Entertainment for attempted extortion. According to the police, the ex-manager surnamed Lee illegally transferred 16 photos of Han and her ex-boyfriend from her digital camera to his mobile phone. Lee then threatened to publish the compromising photos unless he and his two accomplices were paid ; Han's father paid them . In a press release, Han's agency BH Entertainment said the actress did not engage in any activities that deserve public criticism and threatened "strong measures" to deal with blackmail.

In September 2014, the South Korean media reported that a petition was being circulated to boycott Han's appearance in TV commercials. The petition stemmed from Han's younger brother allegedly bullying a fellow airman while both were in mandatory military service that resulted in the latter's suicide. The negative publicity was exacerbated by Han herself having once been appointed as a goodwill ambassador for the Republic of Korea Air Force.

Filmography

Film

Television series

Web series

Television shows

Music video appearances

Discography

Singles

Awards and nominations

State honors

Listicles

References

External links

 Han Hyo-joo at BH Entertainment 
 Han Hyo-joo at FlaMme 
 Han Hyo-joo on Instagram

1987 births
Living people
21st-century South Korean actresses
Dongguk University alumni
People from North Chungcheong Province
South Korean female models
South Korean film actresses
South Korean Roman Catholics
South Korean television actresses
Best Actress Paeksang Arts Award (television) winners